The Tunnel Fire, was a wildfire burning in  Coconino National Forest and Sunset Crater Volcano National Monument, the Lack Bill Park neighborhood north of the city of Flagstaff, Arizona in the United States, and along U.S. Route 89 The fire was named after a tunnel landmark on Waterline Road, near where it ignited on Sunday, April 17, 2022. On June 3, 2022, the wildfire was declared 100% contained by Azein. It had burned 26,532 acres (10,737 ha) and had destroyed 30 homes. No fatalities or injuries were reported.

Development

April 
The fire was first reported on April 17, 2022, at approximately 4:22 p.m. MT. The cause of the fire is currently under investigation.

Containment 
The fire is 100% contained as of June 3, 2022.

Impact

Structure 
The fire burned

Closures and evacuations

Infrastructure

Environmental

References 

2022 in Arizona
2022 meteorology
April 2022 events in the United States
Wildfires in Arizona
2022 Arizona wildfires